Horseshoe Bay is a bay, town and suburb on Magnetic Island in the City of Townsville, Queensland, Australia. It is a major tourist accommodation and recreation centre on the island. In the  the suburb of Horseshoe Bay had a population of 578 people.

History
Until 1962, it was known as the town of Bee-Ran.

Horseshoe Bay Post Office opened by 1935 and closed in 1982.

Horseshoe Bay Provisional School opened on 1 July 1949. On 2 September 1954 it became Horseshoe Bay State School. It closed on 28 April 1972. It was located at 2 Heath Street.

From September 2006, Horseshoe Bay was undergoing a string of housing development behind the existing residential area to the southern part of the bay.

Education 
There are no schools in Horseshoe Bay. The nearest primary school is Nelly Bay State School in Nelly Bay on the island. The nearest secondary school is Townsville State High School in Railway Estate in the Townsville mainland.

Amenities
There are a number of parks in the area, including:

 Apjohn Street Park
 Health Street Park

 Pollard Street Park
There is a boat ramp at the intersection of Horseshoe Bay Road and Pacific Drive. It is managed by the Townsville City Council.

References

External links 

 

Towns in Queensland
Geography of Townsville
Bays of Queensland
Magnetic Island